Tevar is a 2019 Pakistani action revenge-thriller film. It is written and directed by Abu Aleeha and produced by Ali Sajjad Shah. The film features Sukaina Khan, Taqi Ahmed, Mathira, Shariq Mehmood and Akbar Subhani in pivotal roles.

Cast 
 Sukaina Khan 
 Akbar Subhani
 Mathira
 Taqi Ahmed
 Sharique Mehmood

Production
Production of this film started with the name "Arifa". However, director of the film has changed the name to Tevar before its release.

Music
The film features the song "Mohay Rung De" written by Amir Khusrow and Sajid Abbas and performed by Abbas.

See also
 Cinema of Pakistan
 Lollywood
 List of highest-grossing Pakistani films
 List of Pakistani films of 2019

References

External links 
 

Pakistani action thriller films
2010s Urdu-language films
2019 films
Films shot in Karachi
Films about revenge
2010s vigilante films
Films directed by Abu Aleeha